Hanna Parviainen (3 August 1874 – 12 February 1938), the executive managing the family sawmills, was the first woman to become a trade counselor for Finland.

Biography
Hanna Maria Parviainen was the daughter of Johan Parviainen and Maria Charlotta Hedberg. She was educated at a boarding school in Geneva, Switzerland before going to a business school in Stockholm. Parviainen worked for her father and inherited his businesses when her brothers and father died. Parviainen was created a Finish trade counselor in 1926, the first woman in Finland to be. However, in the aftermath of the Great Depression Parviainen had to sell her business to the banks. Parviainen had a paternalistic attitude to her workforce and had a house created for the workforce designed by W. G. Palmqvist. Parviainen worked with the architect Wivi Lönn on the design of the orchard in the Sulkula model farm on the shores of Lake Jyväsjärvi. In the orchard different apple varieties were grown and studied in the local climatic conditions. Parviainen also worked with Armas Lindgren on the Säynätsalo Church which she donated to the parish. Parviainen was a philanthropist, when she died she donated her wealth to the YWCA.

References

1874 births
1938 deaths
Business executives